Holy Angels Academy may refer to:

 Holy Angels Academy (Buffalo, New York)
 Holy Angels Academy (Louisville, Kentucky)